On March 18, 1925, one of the deadliest tornado outbreaks in recorded history generated at least twelve significant tornadoes and spanned a large portion of the midwestern and southern United States. In all, at least 751 people were killed and more than 2,298 were injured, making the outbreak the deadliest tornado outbreak, March 18 the deadliest tornado day, and 1925 the deadliest tornado year in U.S. history. The outbreak generated several destructive tornadoes in Missouri, Illinois, and Indiana on the same day, as well as significant tornadoes in Alabama and Kansas. In addition to confirmed tornadoes, there were undoubtedly others with lesser impacts, the occurrences of which have been lost to history.

The outbreak included the Tri-State tornado, the deadliest tornado in U.S. history and the second-deadliest registered in world history. The  track left by the tornado, as it crossed from southeastern Missouri, through southern Illinois, and then into southwestern Indiana, is also the longest ever recorded. Modern meteorological re-analysis has suggested that the extremely long path length and lifespan reported in historical accounts are perhaps more plausibly attributed to multiple independent tornadoes belonging to a tornado family, rather than a single, continuous tornado. Although not officially rated by NOAA, the Tri-State tornado is recognized by most experts (such as Tom Grazulis and Ted Fujita) as an F5 tornado, the maximum damage rating issued on the Fujita scale.

Background

During a six-year review study of the Tri-State tornado published in 2013, new surface and upper air data was obtained and meteorological reanalysis was utilized, adding significantly to knowledge of the synoptic and even mesoscale background of the event. The late winter to early spring of 1925 was warmer and drier than normal over much of the central United States. There apparently was persistent ridging in the western U.S. with a troughing pattern over the central U.S.

The extratropical cyclone that set the synoptic stage for the outbreak was centered over northwestern Montana at 7:00 a.m. CST (13:00 UTC) on March 17. Meanwhile, a diffuse area of surface low pressure was centered near Denver, Colorado, in association with a lee trough. Occluded fronts extended from Hudson Bay southwestward into the northern Plains states and into the lee trough. The synoptic cyclone moved south-southeastward across the mountain states to eastern Colorado. A warm front stretched along the Gulf Coast, separating warm, moist air from cool, showery weather with areas of fog that extended from Texas to the Carolinas. A well-mixed early-season continental tropical (cT) air mass existed over West Texas and northern New Mexico. To the east of this hot, dry air, buoyant maritime tropical (mT) air was advecting from the Gulf of Mexico. Simultaneously, a mid- to upper-level shortwave trough likely approached the northwest coast of the U.S. and moved rapidly through the persistent ridge then digging southeastward across the Great Basin and central Rocky Mountains and emerging in the Plains over Colorado. This initiated a "Colorado low" cyclogenesis.

At 7:00 a.m. A maritime Polar (mP) cold front draped southwestward across eastern Texas with a dry line forming directly to the south of the low. The open shortwave, likely somewhat negatively tilted, was continuing to approach from the northwest and an apparent outflow boundary moved just to the south of the warm front over northeastern Arkansas and northwestern Tennessee. Several weak pressure troughs were traversing the cool sector over the north-central U.S.. This resulted in unstable air and lower cloud bases, or low LCL heights, which is favorable to tornadogenesis. From southeastern Kansas to Kentucky and Indiana, early morning showers and thunderstorms north of the low and warm front cooled and stabilized that air, retarding northward advancement of the front, and led to a sharp contrast in temperature from north to south. Such baroclinic zones are also associated with tornadic storms. Ahead of the surface dry line, which are uncommon as far east as the Mississippi River, an apparent "dry punch" of air aloft served to further increase instability. Concurrently, a capping inversion likely suppressed storms throughout the warm sector, leaving the Tri-State supercell undisturbed by nearby convection.

By 12:00 p.m. CST (18:00 UTC), the deepening surface low was centered over south-central Missouri, the shortwave axis was moving easterly and oriented over eastern Oklahoma, and the dry line was rapidly advancing eastward directly south of the low as the warm front, situated due east of the low, slowly shifted northward. Morning clouds cleared by midday across much of the Tri-State tornado's eventual path. A pronounced pressure trough extended northeast of the low and signaled its future track as a prefrontal trough formed southeast of the low ahead of the dry line. A bulge in the dry line may also have been forming slightly south of the low, and southerly to southeasterly surface winds were backing and increasing with time throughout the warm sector. The Tri-State supercell formed in a highly favorable area just ahead of the triple point where the cold front, warm front, and dry line met. The supercell initiated very near the surface low and moved east-northeastward, faster than the low, such that the storm gradually deviated east of the low's track. The supercell remained near this "sweet spot" for a prolonged period as it also traveled near the highly baroclinic warm front (likely just across the cool side of the boundary) for several hours.

By 2:00 p.m. CST (20:00 UTC), the low was centered slightly south-southwest of St. Louis, Missouri, as the Tri-State supercell neared the Mississippi River. Other storms in the warm sector, removed from the Tri-State supercell, were initiating around 3:00 p.m. CST (21:00 UTC). Around 4:00 p.m. This pressure is not particularly low compared to many other outbreak setups, but the pressure gradient was strong, which induced strong gradient winds and significant advection in the warm sector. A very strong low level jet was also in place just above the surface as winds veered with height, resulting in low-level curvature and long hodographs. Theoretical hodographs returned estimated storm relative environmental helicity (SREH) values of 340 m2 s−2 in the vicinity of the Tri-State supercell track. Strong thunderstorms were now scattered throughout the warm sector and a line of severe thunderstorms was occurring near the dry line. The Tri-State supercell appeared to still be discrete and isolated, with a severe storm north of Cairo, Illinois, placed well to its south.

By 6:00 p.m. CST (00:00 UTC), the shortwave axis was over eastern Missouri and was lifting northeast. At 7:00 p.m. CST (01:00 UTC), the low was placed near Indianapolis, Indiana, with numerous thunderstorms east and south of the low and a squall line moving into the southeastern U.S. Cold air advection behind the strong cold front fed into the cyclone as snow and sleet fell from eastern Iowa to central Michigan. At 7:00 a.m. CST on March 19, the low was deepening and lifting rapidly northeastward into Canada.

Confirmed tornadoes
These are estimated tornado ratings as tornado ratings in the United States are not official until 1950.

Tri-State tornado

The tornado was first sighted as a highly visible and relatively small condensation funnel in the rugged forested hills of Moore Township, Shannon County, Missouri, at about 12:40 p.m. CST. However, this was likely a separate member of the tornado family, and the main member likely began in Reynolds County, west-northwest of Ellington, around five minutes later. The first fatality occurred around 1:01 p.m. CST (19:01 UTC), when a farmer was caught off-guard north-northwest of Ellington.

The tornado sped to the northeast, moving into Iron County and hitting the mining town of Annapolis. Within a matter of minutes, two people were killed and 90% of the town was leveled. The tornado then struck the mining town of Leadanna, where mining machinery and several structures were destroyed. It then crossed into the sparsely populated areas of Madison County south of Fredericktown, where near Cherokee Pass the tornado steadily began to grow larger.

In Bollinger County, 32 children were injured when two schools were damaged. Multiple homes and farms were completely destroyed near Lixville, where a farmer and two children were killed, and a third child died from her injuries one week after the storm. Deep ground scouring was observed near the town of Sedgewickville as well.

Crossing into Perry County, the tornado reportedly developed a double funnel as it struck the town of Biehle, destroying many homes in and around the town and killing two people. At Brazeau, another farmer was gravely injured and died four days later. Numerous other homes and farms were completely leveled near Frohna as well, where one woman was killed and another died from her injuries ten days later. Altogether, at least 12 people (possibly more) died and another 200 were injured in Missouri.

The tornado then crossed the Mississippi River into southern Illinois, debarking trees and deeply scouring the ground in rural areas before hitting the riverside town of Gorham at 2:30 p.m. CST (20:30 UTC), essentially obliterating the entire town. Almost every structure in Gorham was leveled or swept away, and railroad tracks were reportedly ripped from the ground. More than half the town's population was injured or killed; 30 were killed in the immediate storm and 170 were injured, six of whom later died.

The tornado leveled all but the extreme southeastern side of town, where many densely populated working class neighborhoods saw some of the storm's most horrific work. Entire rows of homes were leveled and swept away in some areas. Many other structures were also damaged or destroyed throughout the town, including the M&O railroad shop, where 35 people were killed. Schools in the area were devastated as well, with 17 students killed at the Longfellow School and nine others killed at the Logan School. After the tornado passed, large fires ignited and swept through the rubble, burning many of the trapped survivors alive. In all, 188 people died in the immediate storm at Murphysboro, including at least 20 who were never identified. The official number of injured was a staggering 623, while some other sources claim it could have been higher. Of those injured, 46 more later died, bringing the storm's death toll at Murphysboro to 234, to date being the highest exacted by a tornado of any single city in the United States.

The tornado then struck the farming town of De Soto, which on a scale paralleling Gorham was virtually obliterated. Fifty-six people were killed in the immediate storm, and another 105 were injured, five of whom later died, and many homes were swept away. Thirty-three of the deaths were students that were killed in the partial collapse of the De Soto School, the worst tornadic death toll at a single school in U.S. history. Also killed at De Soto was Jackson County Deputy Sheriff George Boland. While on patrol when the storm struck, the tornado lifted him from the ground and he disappeared into the funnel. His body was never found.

After exiting De Soto, the tornado clipped the northwest corner of Williamson County, narrowly missing the town of Hurst and striking the small village of Bush. Several homes were leveled, and pieces of wood were speared into the town's water tower. Heavy railroad axles were reportedly lifted and scattered across the railyard. The tornado killed 10 people in Bush and the surrounding area, and injured another 37, four of whom later died.

Further east, the tornado crossed into Franklin County, narrowly missing the towns of Royalton and Zeigler, devastating rural areas and killing 25 people—20 of whom perished immediately and another five in the days to come—before heading towards the large mining town of West Frankfort. The tornado struck the northwest side of town, where in a manner similar to what was seen at Murphysboro, a number of densely populated neighborhoods, businesses and mining operations fell victim to the tornado. At the Orient Mine, a large multi-ton coal tipple was blown over and rolled by the tornado. The immediate storm claimed 81 lives at West Frankfort, while injuring a staggering 410, 21 of whom later died, bringing the death toll for the town to 102.

Several small mining villages in the area were obliterated, resulting in numerous fatalities. At Caldwell, a mining village northeast of West Frankfort, 24 people died in the storm, later to be joined by two more of the injured. The heaviest loss to befall a single family was exacted on that of Caldwell storekeeper Isaac 'Ike' Karnes, which lost 11 members. Karnes' wife, a married daughter and her husband, a daughter-in-law and seven grandchildren, ages ranging from newborn to seven years, died in the tornado.

Further to the northeast, the tornado then completely destroyed the small town of Parrish, killing 28 people and injuring 60, five of whom later died, bringing the death toll at Parrish to 33. The destruction of the town was so complete that many residents and businesses moved on, and the town was never rebuilt. The storm continued to devastate more rural areas in the eastern side of the county, claiming another six lives. In all, the storm claimed 192 lives in Franklin County: 159 in the immediate impact and another 33 among the injured in the following weeks.

The tornado proceeded to devastate additional rural areas across Hamilton and White counties, between the two counties claiming 45 lives and injuring 140, 20 of whom later died. Dozens of farms, homes, schools and churches were swept away, 28 people were killed, and nine more of those injured later died. In White County the tornado passed just two miles north of Carmi, missing the towns of Enfield and Crossville by just a few hundred yards. Another 17 were killed and 11 of those injured later died.

Crossing the Wabash River just north of New Harmony, the tornado then entered Indiana. Grazing the northernmost edge of Posey County, the tornado struck and completely demolished the town of Griffin, where not a single structure was left untouched by the storm, and many were completely swept away; 41 people were killed at Griffin and in the surrounding areas, another 202 were injured, with five later dying, bringing the death toll at Griffin to 46.

After exiting Griffin, the tornado made a slight turn towards the northeast as it crossed into Gibson County, devastating rural areas and clipping the northwest corner of Owensville, resulting in nine fatalities. The tornado then roared into the large factory town of Princeton, destroying much of the southern side of the town, killing 38 people and injuring 152, six of whom later died. Large sections of neighborhoods in Princeton were leveled, and a Heinz factory was badly damaged. CST, near Oatsville. In Indiana, at least 95 (and probably more) perished.

Non-tornadic effects
Strong thunderstorms were reported in a broad area that also included parts of Oklahoma, Michigan, Pennsylvania, West Virginia, and Ontario. What began in the early afternoon as discrete supercell thunderstorms eventually consolidated into a potent squall line. By all accounts it was a widespread outbreak with severe thunderstorms occurring as far east as Ohio, as far southwest as Louisiana, and as far southeast as Georgia.

Aftermath and recovery

In the immediate aftermath, hospitals from St. Louis to Evansville were inundated with the injured and dying, as the storm injured more than 2,000 people, 105 of whom later died from their injuries. In Missouri, relief trains carried the most seriously injured north to St. Louis, while the remainder were sent to hospitals at Perryville and Cape Girardeau. At Gorham, where half the town's population was injured, the Missouri Pacific Railroad shuttled most of the injured north to East St. Louis, and the remainder south to Cairo.

The town hospital in Murphysboro, where several hundred were injured, was ill-equipped to deal with the casualties, prompting hundreds to be shipped out to other towns by train once the lines were cleared. The most seriously injured were sent by train to Barnes Hospital in St. Louis. For most of the injured, dying and destitute from Murphysboro, the college town of Carbondale, some seven miles to the southeast, provided a safe haven. At De Soto however, chaos ensued as the affected were scattered in three different directions; six miles south to Carbondale, five miles east to Hurst, or for many, fourteen miles north to Du Quoin. For the tornado victims at Parrish, relief came from Thompsonville three miles to the southeast, where a team of railroad workers with the Illinois Central Railroad led by a heroic physician from Iowa, pulled a train directly into the demolished village. The train was loaded beyond capacity with the dead, injured and dying before proceeding to the northwest to the hospital at Benton.

The storm claimed its final victim on January 3, 1926, when Gervais Burgess, a 46-year-old coal miner from West Frankfort, died from injuries sustained in the tornado.

In addition to the dead and injured, thousands were left without shelter or food. Fires erupted, growing to conflagrations in some places, exacerbating the damage. 

In the end, a total of 695 were confirmed dead – 12 in Missouri, 95 in Indiana and 588 in Illinois. Three states, 14 counties, and more than 19 communities, four of which were effectively effaced (several of these and other rural areas never recovered), were in the path of the tornado, which had lasted a record duration of three and a half hours. Approximately 15,000 homes were destroyed by the Tri-State tornado. Total damage was estimated at $16.5 million in 1925 dollars; adjusted for increases in population/wealth and inflation, the toll is approximately $1.4 billion (1997 USD), surpassed only by two extremely destructive tornadoes, each of which was posthumously rated F4, both in the City of St. Louis, in 1896 and 1927.

Nine schools across three states were destroyed, in which 69 students were killed. More schools were destroyed and more students killed (as well as the single school record of 33 deaths in De Soto, Illinois) than in any other tornadic event in U.S. history. Deaths occurred at many rural schools. Counting those returning home from schools and those that died in schools, the toll was 72 students. Approximately one-third of the tornado's victims were children. The rural death toll of 65 in Hamilton and White counties in southeastern Illinois is unprecedented. The tornado killed at least 20 farm owners in southeastern Illinois and southwestern Indiana, more than the combined total of the next four deadliest tornadoes in the history of the United States.

Meteorological significance
While no photographs or film reels of the Tri-State tornado were taken or are known to exist, the tornado was frequently described by witnesses as an "amorphous rolling fog" or "boiling clouds on the ground", and fooled normally weather-wise farm owners (in addition to people in general) who did not sense the danger until the storm was upon them. The condensation funnel was also reportedly sometimes wrapped in copious dust and debris, which likely obscured it and made it less recognizable. The parent supercell apparently transitioned to a high-precipitation (HP) variety by the time it struck West Frankfort, meaning that the tornado was not readily visible as it approached, as it was often shrouded in heavy rain and hail. The very strong tornado – modern meteorologists estimate that its wind speeds topped  in some locations – at times exhibited an unusual appearance due partially to its size (at one point in Missouri, it was a full mile wide) and the probable low cloud base of its parent thunderstorm.

There has long been uncertainty as to whether the originally recognized reports of a  path over 3.5 hours represent a single continuous tornado or multiple independently tracking tornadoes belonging to a tornado family. Because of the scarcity of verifiable meteorological data from the time of the event and the apparent absence of any record of a tornado having approached this path length and duration in the years since, doubts have been raised about the plausibility of the conclusion that a single tornado was responsible for them.

Modern meteorological theory regarding tornado and supercell morphology and dynamics suggests that a single tornado lasting for such a duration is highly improbable. Several other historical accounts of very long track (VLT) tornadoes have subsequently been determined to be the product of tornado families (notably the Charleston-Mattoon, Illinois tornado family of May 1917 and the Woodward, Oklahoma tornado family of April 1947). In more recent years, some VLT tornadoes and supercells have indeed occurred, with 12 tornadoes exceeding  path lengths from 1980–2012, and 60 since 1950. Yet the high-end estimates of the Tri-State tornado path length are still far longer than the nearest verified VLT tornado. Only 4 tornadoes have confirmed paths longer than  without being tornado families. Two of them occurred during the 2011 Super Outbreak, one an EF5, and another an EF4, another occurred during an outbreak in April 2010, rated EF4, and a fourth occurred in December 2021, also rated EF4. On the other hand, meteorological analysis reveals no record of any analogous mesoscale circumstances in recent history, meaning that the weather conditions which led to the Tri-State tornado were apparently unique. No single factor accounts for the exceptional path length and duration, though the fast forward motion of the tornado, which averaged , may have translated to more distance covered.

In 2001, tornado expert Tom Grazulis wrote that the first  of the track was probably the result of two or more tornadoes, and that a  segment of the overall path length was seemingly continuous. The scientists concluded it is likely that at least some of the track, both at the beginning and ending, was indeed caused by separate tornadoes.

The 2013 study concludes that it is likely that the  segment from central Madison County, Missouri to Pike County, Indiana, was the result of one continuous tornado, and that the  segment from central Bollinger County, Missouri to western Pike County, Indiana, was very likely the result of a single continuous tornado. Either of these two values still holds the record for the longest recorded tornado track. However, this  segment of the path is considered most likely to be continuous solely because observations were sufficiently dense, whereas the  portion from westernmost Reynolds County, Missouri, to westernmost Pike County, Indiana, contained several gaps in which eyewitnesses and reports of damage were lacking, owing primarily to sparse patterns of human settlement, but even this may well have been continuous because the alignment of reports showed a consistent heading, suggestive of a single tornado rather than a family.

See also

List of tornadoes and tornado outbreaks
List of North American tornadoes and tornado outbreaks
List of tornado-related deaths at schools
List of F5 and EF5 tornadoes
Tornado outbreak sequence of December 18–20, 1957 – Produced another violent tornado that paralleled the Tri-State tornado in Illinois
Daulatpur–Saturia tornado – Deadliest tornado worldwide in recorded history that struck Manikganj District in Bangladesh on April 26, 1989.
Tornado outbreak of December 10–11, 2021 – Also known as the "Quad-State tornado outbreak", another deadly tornado outbreak that produced a long-tracked tornado, which was initially believed to have tracked over 4 states, but was later found to have not done so

Notes

References

Sources

External links
 1925 Tri-State Tornado (NWS Paducah, KY)
 The Weather Channel's Storm of the Century list – #7 The Tri-State Tornado
 The Great Tri-State Tornado (RootsWeb Genealogy)
 The 1925 Tornado (Carolyar.com Genealogy)
 aerial film of damage path
 'The 1925 Tri-State Tornado Damage Path Analysis' By R.H. Johns & Associates

F5 tornadoes
Tornadoes of 1925
Tornadoes in Missouri
Tornadoes in Illinois
Tornadoes in Indiana
Shannon County, Missouri
Reynolds County, Missouri
Iron County, Missouri
Madison County, Missouri
Bollinger County, Missouri
Perry County, Missouri
Jackson County, Illinois
Williamson County, Illinois
Franklin County, Illinois
Hamilton County, Illinois
White County, Illinois
Gibson County, Indiana
Posey County, Indiana
Pike County, Indiana
1925 in the United States
1925 in Indiana
1925 in Illinois
1925 in Missouri
March 1925 events
1925 natural disasters in the United States